Davit Aslanadze (born 16 November 1976 in Kutaisi) is a retired Georgian professional football player.

1976 births
Living people
Footballers from Georgia (country)
Georgia (country) international footballers
Association football goalkeepers